The Stadsprijs Geraardsbergen is a single-day road bicycle race held annually in August or September in Geraardsbergen, Belgium. The race is a professional cycling race, but is not listed as a UCI event.

Winners

External links
 Cyclingarchives

Recurring sporting events established in 1912
1912 establishments in Belgium
Cycle races in Belgium
Men's road bicycle races
Geraardsbergen